Iliana Calabró (born June 1, 1966) is an Argentine actress.

Works

Television
 Calabromas (1978)
 El Contra (1992) 
 Campeones de la vida (2000) - (2001) 
 Historias de sexo de gente común (2004) 
 Casados con hijos (2005) 
 Cantando por un Sueño (2006) 
 Bailando por un sueño (2007) 
 Para siempre (2007) 
 El show de Iliana (2008) 
 El Musical de tus Sueños (2009) 
 Cantando por un sueño (2012)
 Masterchef Celebrity Arg. (2020)

Film
 Mingo y Aníbal contra los fantasmas (1985)
 Johnny Tolengo, el majestuoso (1987)
 Adiós, abuelo (1996)
 Papá se volvió loco (2005)

References

External links
 Official site 
 Iliana Calabro Latest News and Photos 

Argentine film actresses
Argentine television actresses
Actresses from Buenos Aires
Living people
1966 births
Participants in Argentine reality television series
Bailando por un Sueño (Argentine TV series) participants